Filip Krajinović was the defending champion but chose not to defend his title.

Rudolf Molleker won the title after defeating Jiří Veselý 4–6, 6–4, 7–5 in the final.

Seeds

Draw

Finals

Top half

Bottom half

External Links
Main Draw
Qualifying Draw

Heilbronner Neckarcup - Singles
2018 Singles